Stephen Kinsey (born December 15, 1958) is an American  politician and Democratic Party member of the Pennsylvania House of Representatives, serving since 2013. Kinsey had served as the chief of staff to state Representative John Myers, who preceded Kinsey in office. Kinsey served as the chair of the Pennsylvania Legislative Black Caucus during the 2019-2020 legislative session.

Kinsey grew up in Philadelphia, graduating from Germantown High School in 1976. He received his Bachelor of Science in Education from West Chester University in 1981 and his Master of Business Administration from Eastern University in 2002.

Kinsey represents the 201st House District, which is located within Philadelphia and includes parts of the Germantown, Mt. Airy, West Oak Lane, and Ogontz neighborhoods. During his tenure in the House, he has served on the Appropriations, Health, Human Services, and Transportation committees.

References

External links
 
Legislative page

Living people
Democratic Party members of the Pennsylvania House of Representatives
1958 births
Politicians from Philadelphia
West Chester University alumni
Eastern University (United States) alumni
African-American state legislators in Pennsylvania
21st-century American politicians
21st-century African-American politicians
20th-century African-American people